Martin Honecker (9 June 1888 – 20 October 1941) was a German philosopher and psychologist.

Biography
The son of a businessman, he studied at the Rheinische Friedrich-Wilhelms University in Bonn and the Ludwig-Maximilians University of Munich, with, among others, Adolf Dyroff. In 1914 Honecker graduated with a doctorate in the legal philosophy of Alessandro Turamini. He fought in World War I, but was captured by the French and interned in Switzerland.

During his imprisonment he began his work Gegenstandslogik und Denklogik. In 1924 he took over the chair of Josef Geyser in Freiburg as a full professor.

From 1925 to 1929 he was secretary general of the Görres-Stiftung. From 1925 to 1926 he was one of the editors of the quarterly education journal Pädagogik. He also edited the philosophy journals Forschungen zur Geschichte der Philosophie der Neuzeit and Philosophische Handbibliothek. He was doctoral advisor of Roman Catholic theologian Karl Rahner.

During World War II he worked as an Army psychologist at the Generalkommando V in Stuttgart.

Works
Die Staatsphilosophie des Sebastian Fox Morcillo, 1914 
Das Denken. Versuch einer gemeinverständlichen Gesamtdarstellung, 1925 
Synthesen in der Philosophie der Gegenwart, Festgabe Adolf Dyroff zum 60. Geburtstag. Schroeder, Bonn 1926, mit Erich Feldmann 
Logik. Eine Systematik des logischen Probleme, 1927, 1942 
Gegenstandslogik und Denklogik. Vorschlag zu einer Neugestaltung der Logik., 1928 
Die Probleme der Wertungspsychologie, in: Philosophia Perennis. Abhandlungen zu ihrer *Vergangenheit und Gegenwart. Festschrift, Josef Geyser zum 60. Geburtstag. Hrsg. von Fritz-Joachim von Rintelen, Bd. 1, Regensburg 1930 
Jahresbericht der Görres-Gesellschaft 1928/1929, 1930 
Nikolaus von Cues und die griechische Sprache, Heidelberg: Carl Winter, 1938

Notes

20th-century German philosophers
Continental philosophers
Phenomenologists
1888 births
1941 deaths
German male writers